The Turkmenistan national futsal team represents Turkmenistan in international futsal competitions and is controlled by the Football Federation of Turkmenistan.

Overview
Turkmenistan can count themselves fortunate to have avoided preliminary qualification for the 2008 AFC Futsal Championship. They grabbed the last direct spot in the finals even though they finished bottom of their finals group in 2007. Turkmenistan caused the first real upset of the championship with a 1–0 win over Australia in their opening game, Elman Tagayev scoring the only goal in the first half. But they went backwards after that with a 1–7 loss to Kyrgyzstan and a 2–5 reversal to Korea Republic. Turkmenistan were not expected to make it out of the group after poor performances in previous championships. They were uninspiring in 2005 and the following year had little chance in a group that included powerhouses Iran and ASEAN kingpins Thailand. But with more games under their belt, the relatively young squad will be aiming for better results this year.

In March 2019, the Football Federation of Turkmenistan named Robert Grdović as the head coach of the Turkmenistan national futsal team, signing a one-year contract.

Tournament records

FIFA Futsal World Cup
 1989 – Part of Soviet Union
 1992 – Did not enter
 1996 – Did not enter
 2000 – Did not enter
 2004 – Did not enter
 2008 – Did not qualify
 2012 – Did not qualify
 2016 – Did not qualify
 2021 – Did not qualify

AFC Futsal Championship

Futsal at the Asian Indoor and Martial Arts Games
 2005 - Did not enter
 2007 - Did not enter
 2009 - 4th Place
 2013 - Round 1
 2017 - Quarterfinals (host)

Squad 
Squad for the 2020 AFC Futsal Championship qualification
 Mulkaman Annagulyýew
 Myrat Annaýew
 Watan Ataýew
 Meretgeldi Baýramow
 Dayanç Garadjaýew
 Abdylla Gurbannepesow
 Allamyrat Gurbanow
 Allaberdi Meredow
 Öwezbaý Muhammetmyradow
 Maksat Myradow
 Serdar Rejepow
 Berdymyrat Sapardurdyýew
 Arzuwguly Sapargulyýew
 Gurbangeldi Sähedow

Manager history

See also
Turkmenistan national football team

References 

Asian national futsal teams
Futsal
National futsal